The 1971 Los Angeles Rams season was the team's 34th year with the National Football League, and the 26th season in Los Angeles. The team looked to improve on its 9–4–1 record from 1970, but finished only one game below their goal, as they finished 8–5–1 and finished 2nd in the NFC West, behind the San Francisco 49ers (9–5).

The Rams started out strong at 4–1–1, but split their final eight games. Despite sweeping the 49ers on the season, a crucial tie against the Atlanta Falcons in week 2 proved to doom the Rams, because had they beaten Atlanta, they would've clinched the NFC West by virtue of their sweep over the 49ers.

Team owner Dan Reeves died of cancer prior to the season in April.

NFL Draft

Roster

Regular season
As they had in 1970, the Rams and 49ers staged a season long battle for the NFC West title that came down to the season's final game. The Rams season got off to a rocky and controversial start in New Orleans against the Saints and their rookie quarterback Archie Manning. The Saints trailed 20–17 in the final seconds and faced 4th and goal from the Rams' 1-yard line. Instead of settling for a tie (there was no overtime for regular season games in the NFL in 1971), the Saints gambled and went for the win. Manning ran a quarterback sneak in which the officials signaled touchdown, although television replays showed that Manning was stopped short of the goal line. So instead of a 20–17 win, the Rams lost 24–20. In week 2 the Rams needed a last second field goal to tie the Atlanta Falcons, 20–20.

The Rams appeared to right their ship by winning their next four games, including a 20–13 win in San Francisco. But back-to-back losses to the Miami Dolphins and Baltimore Colts left the 4–3–1 Rams  games behind the 6–2 49ers. Then the Rams won 2 straight, including a 17–6 win in San Francisco; that gave the Rams a -game lead in the division and they held the tiebreaker over the 49ers by virtue of their season sweep of S.F. The Rams then lost a Thanksgiving game in Dallas 28–21, but re-took the division lead with two games to play by beating the Saints 45–28. However, just as they had the year before, the Rams lost a Monday night game at home, this time to the Redskins, coached by former Rams head coach George Allen, 38–24. And just like the previous season's Monday night home loss to the Lions, this one ended up costing the Rams both the division title and the wild card berth (won by the Redskins). The Rams won their final game in Pittsburgh 23–14, but learned on their flight home that the 49ers rallied beat the Lions with a 4th-quarter touchdown, 31–27.

Schedule

Standings

References

Los Angeles Rams
Los Angeles Rams seasons
Los Angeles Rams